Charles Rahr (December 17, 1865 – November 4, 1925) was an American businessman and politician.

Born in Oshkosh, Wisconsin, Rahr was the owner of the Rahr Brewing Company in Oshkosh, Wisconsin. Rahr served in the Wisconsin State Assembly and was a Republican and served one term. Rahr died suddenly of a heart attack at his home in Oshkosh, Wisconsin. Rahr was interred at Riverside Cemetery.

Notes

1865 births
1925 deaths
Politicians from Oshkosh, Wisconsin
Businesspeople from Wisconsin
Republican Party members of the Wisconsin State Assembly